|}

The Wetherby Mares' Hurdle is a Listed National Hunt horse race in Great Britain which is open to mares aged four years or older. It is run at Wetherby over a distance of about 2 miles (3,219 metres), and during its running there are nine hurdles to be jumped. The race is scheduled to take place each year in late October or early November.

It was first run in 2007 over 2 miles as the Daniel Gath Homes Mares Only Hurdle Race and was won by Annie's Answer. In 2008 the race distance was increased by half a furlong due to track reconfiguration at Wetherby Racecourse and bet365 took over the sponsorship of the race between 2008 and 2011.

From 2012 to 2018 OLBG were the race sponsors. It returned to the 2 miles distance from 2015. Bet365 resumed sponsorship from the 2019 running and the race is now titled the bet365 Mares' Hurdle.

Winners

See also 
 Horse racing in Great Britain
 List of British National Hunt races

References

Racing Post:

National Hunt hurdle races
National Hunt races in Great Britain
Wetherby Racecourse
2007 establishments in England
Recurring sporting events established in 2007